Ziv Bar-Joseph is an Israeli computational biologist and Professor in the Computational Biology Department and the Machine Learning Department at the Carnegie Mellon School of Computer Science.

Education
Bar-Joseph studied computer science at Bachelor of Science (1997) and Master of Science (1999) level, both at the Hebrew University of Jerusalem. He gained his PhD from the Massachusetts Institute of Technology in computer science in 2003, under the supervision of David K. Gifford and Tommi S. Jaakkola. Following this, he was a postdoctoral associate at the MIT Computer Science and Artificial Intelligence Laboratory (CSAIL) and the Whitehead Institute.

Research
Bar-Joseph's research at Carnegie Mellon is primarily focused on developing computational methods to allow greater understanding of the interactions and dynamics of complex biological systems, particularly systems that change with time, such as the cell cycle.

At MIT, Bar-Joseph's group developed a novel algorithm to discover regulatory networks of gene modules in yeast. These modules are groups of genes that work together to perform tasks such as respiration, protein synthesis and response to external stress.

He is also interested in how insights from both computer science and biology can be used to affect the other field, in particular how algorithms from nature can be used in order to improve algorithms in distributed computing.

Awards and honours
Bar-Joseph has been awarded the DIMACS-Celera Genomics Graduate Student Award in Computational Molecular Biology and the NSF CAREER award. He was awarded the ISCB Overton Prize in 2012 in recognition of his significant and lasting impact in computational biology.

He co-chaired the Research in Computational Molecular Biology (RECOMB) conference in 2009 and 2010 and joined the board of the journal Bioinformatics as an Associate Editor in 2013.

Personal life
Bar-Joseph is a keen runner and has run several sub-3 hour marathons. He lives in Pittsburgh and Shoham with his wife and three children.

See also
Michal Linial

References

Israeli bioinformaticians
Living people
Hebrew University of Jerusalem alumni
MIT School of Engineering alumni
Carnegie Mellon University faculty
Overton Prize winners
1971 births